Jacques Charrier (born 6 November 1936) is a French actor in both film and the theater, a film producer, and an artist in painting and ceramics. He was married to film actress Brigitte Bardot from 1959 to 1963.

Biography
In 1980 he returned to the School of Fine Arts, and went back to painting that was full of references to his two passions, travel and antiquity. His art work has been regularly exhibited  in Paris, Geneva and San Francisco.
With the publication of the memoirs of Brigitte Bardot, he found himself in the media spotlight. He sued for "violation of privacy", and was successful.

Personal life
In 1959, he married Brigitte Bardot; they had one son, Nicolas-Jacques Charrier, before divorcing in 1963. In 1964, he married France Louis-Dreyfus, of the Louis-Dreyfus family, with whom he had two daughters, Sophie and Marie, before divorcing in 1967. In 1982, he met his third wife Linda with whom he had one daughter, Rosalie. Since 2009, he has been married to Japanese artist Makiko Kumano. Since 1997 he has lived in Paris.

Selected filmography

References

External links 
 

1936 births
Living people
Actors from Metz
French male film actors
French male stage actors
Louis-Dreyfus family